Jon-Lewis Dickinson (born 3 May 1986) is from Edmondsley in County Durham and is a British former professional boxer who competed from 2008 to 2016.He held the British cruiserweight title from 2012 to 2014 and challenged once for the Commonwealth cruiserweight title in 2014.

In his early fights he beat journeymen Paul Bonson and Hastings Rasani on points, before winning the Prizefighter series in April 2010 beating Leon Williams, Mark Krence and Nick Okoth. In July, however, he suffered a shock knockout loss to Tyrone Wright, and followed it up by retiring on his stool against Richard Turba, after suffering a badly broken jaw, which prevented him boxing for the following 12 months.

Dickinson returned in July 2011 with a win over 2002 Commonwealth Games gold medallist David Dolan before beating Chris Burton in February 2012. He won the English cruiserweight title in March 2012 with a UD10 win over Matty Askin, in a fight that was also a British title eliminator. Dickinson won the British Cruiserweight title in October 2012, beating former champion Shane McPhilbin by unanimous decision, in a challenge for the vacant title at the Echo Arena Liverpool. After three successful defences, which saw him retain the Lord Lonsdale belt outright, he lost the title in June 2014 at the Metro Radio Arena when he was stopped in the second round by Ovill McKenzie.
He KO’d Scotland’s Stephen Simmons, to take the WBC Continental silver title in an exciting contest.

His younger brother Travis Dickinson is also a professional boxer who fights at light-heavyweight, and also won Prizefighter in January 2011. The pair are the only brothers ever to win Prizefighter.

Professional boxing record

References

External links 
 

1986 births
Living people
Cruiserweight boxers
Prizefighter contestants
English male boxers
Sportspeople from County Durham